Matsu may refer to:
 Mazu, or Matsu, a sea goddess in Chinese folk religion
 Matsu-class destroyer
 Matsu Islands (Lienchiang County), Fujian, Republic of China (Taiwan)
 Matsu Beigan Airport
 Matsushima (Matsu Islands), in Miyagi Prefecture, Japan
 Japanese ship Matsu, several ships
 Matsu (Sekirei), a character in the Sekirei manga and anime
 Japanese pine (まつ, 松), matsu in Japanese

See also
 Matanuska-Susitna Valley (Mat-Su Valley, an area in South Central Alaska
 Matanuska-Susitna Borough (Mat-Su Borough), a borough of Alaska
 Mazu (disambiguation), Chinese origin of matsu
 Open Commons Consortium (Project Matsu), imaging process project for human assisted disaster relief named after the goddess